The Burning Court is a French-Italian-German film directed by Julien Duvivier, released in 1962. The script was written by Charles Spaak and Duvivier, from the 1937 novel of the same name by John Dickson Carr.

The cast included Catherine Rich who was making her debut on the screen.

Plot
Historian Michel Boissard (Walter Giller), is invited with his wife Marie (Édith Scob), a descendant of Madame de Brinvilliers, the notorious poisoner, to the château of Mathias Desgrez (Frédéric Duvallès). Mathias Desgrez is a descendant of the  last lover of the Marchioness,  who denounced her.  Mathias is  adept in the occult arts, which he practises with his friend Dr. Hermann (Antoine Balpêtré). To the château come Marc Desgrez (Jean-Claude Brialy), and Stephane Desgrez (Claude Rich), nephews of Mathias, who are waiting impatiently for their inheritance. The wife of Marc, Lucy (Perrette Pradier) also has hopes. And Marc's mistress Myra (Nadja Tiller) who is Mathias' personal nurse, would like to accelerate Marc's uncle's death. Mathias himself is fascinated by Marie Boissard.

One night, a little time later, Mathias dies having received a visit from a mysterious woman bringing him medications, and is seen by a servant. Mathias is buried and then his body disappears just when the analysis proves that he has undoubtedly been poisoned.  By whom? Lucy - eager to inherit? Myra - to please her lover? Marie - to avenge her betrayed ancestor, by the ancestor of Mathias? Inspector Krauss (Claude Piéplu) enquires into the matter.

References

External links
 

1962 films
1960s thriller films
French thriller films
Italian thriller films
West German films
1960s French-language films
Films based on British novels
Films directed by Julien Duvivier
Films scored by Georges Auric
Films set in France
German thriller films
1960s Italian films
1960s French films
1960s German films